Jon Cotton is a British music producer and entrepreneur.  He is CEO of production companies Poseidon and Mesmerica/Moodswings LLC.  

His previous production work includes producing 2007’s Ivor Novello winner ‘Elusive’ by Scott Matthews (San Remo / Island), producing Scottish singer Jo Hamilton and work with 2009 Mercury Prize nominees Sweet Billy Pilgrim.

Jon is also heavily involved in music for television and film.  He produced the original soundtrack to the 2009 BAFTA award-winning feature film ‘Nativity’ starring Alan Carr and Martin Freeman (Decca) and has co-written the music to several current BBC series including Inside Out (BBC1), Nation on Film (BBC2), all 6 series of Richard Hammond’s Helicopter Heroes (BBC1) and A History of the World in 100 objects (BBC2) as well as numerous advertisements.

He has also consulted to Ragdoll (creators of the Teletubbies and In The Night Garden) and written a number of technical articles for Sound on Sound magazine.

Discography 

 1996 Broadcast - The Book Lovers EP (Warp) engineer
 2001 Gramophone - Gramophone (Artisan / Artful / M10) producer, strings
 2003 Sweet Billy Pilgrim - Forget to Breathe (Wonderland Avenue) producer, strings
 2004 Carina Round - The Disconnection (Interscope) strings
 2004 Kealer -  My Own Worst Enemy (Jive/BMG) strings
 2006 Scott Matthews - Passing Stranger (Island)  producer, engineer, mix; won 2007 Ivor Novello award for best song
 2007 Carina Round - Slow Motion Addict (Interscope) strings
 2009 Jo Hamilton - Gown (Poseidon) producer, engineer, mix
 2009  Nativity! - Soundtrack (Decca) producer
 2010 Bertolf - Snakes & Ladders (8Ball) strings
 2011 Scott Matthews - What the Night Delivers (San Remo) - producer, engineer, mix, master
 2011 Sweet Billy Pilgrim - Crown and Treaty (Luxor Purchase/EMI) - mixing
 2015 The Swingles - Deep End (Absolute) - producer, engineer, mix

Living people
Year of birth missing (living people)